The 2020–21 season is Pallacanestro Trieste's 46th in existence and the club's 3rd consecutive season in the top tier Italian basketball.

Overview

Kit 
Supplier: Adidas / Sponsor: Allianz

Players

Current roster

Depth chart

Squad changes

In

|}

Out

|}

Confirmed 

|}

From youth team 

|}

Coach

On loan

Competitions

Supercup

Italian Cup 
Trieste qualified to the 2021 Italian Basketball Cup by ending the first half of the LBA season in the 7th position. They played the quarterfinal against the 2nd ranking Happy Casa Brindisi.

Serie A

Regular season

Playoffs

Quarterfinals

See also 

 2020–21 LBA season
 2021 Italian Basketball Cup
 2020 Italian Basketball Supercup

References 

2020–21 in Italian basketball by club